Matvei Grigorievich Vainrub (2 May 1910 – 14 February 1998) was a Soviet Lieutenant-General, Commander of the tank troops and deputy commander of the 62nd Army (later 8th Guards Army) in the Battle of Stalingrad, World War II; Hero of the Soviet Union. Postwar, he was deputy commander of the Kiev Military District. Vainrub had a long career in the Soviet military, retiring in 1970. He was a brother of Yevsei Vainrub.

References

External links
 

1910 births
1998 deaths
Belarusian Jews
Communist Party of the Soviet Union members
Heroes of the Soviet Union
People from Barysaw
Soviet lieutenant generals
Soviet Jews
Soviet Jews in the military
Soviet military personnel of World War II
Recipients of the Order of Lenin
Recipients of the Order of the Red Banner
Recipients of the Order of Bogdan Khmelnitsky (Soviet Union), 1st class
Recipients of the Order of Suvorov, 2nd class
Recipients of the Order of Kutuzov, 2nd class
Frunze Military Academy alumni
Military Academy of the General Staff of the Armed Forces of the Soviet Union alumni